The Tafawa Balewa Square, (TBS) is a  ceremonial ground (originally called "Race Course") in Lagos Island, Lagos.

History 
Lagos Race Course now TBS, was a sports field that hosted horse racing, but included a section for football and ground to play cricket. The land was provided to colonial authorities by Oba Dosunmu in 1859, who thereafter, built up the surrounding areas.  The course was later demolished by the government of Yakubu Gowon to make way for Tafawa Balewa Square. In its hey days, the course hosted the Empire Day parades. The horse racing track was about seven to eight furlongs or a mile.

In 1960, the course was redeveloped to celebrate Nigeria's independence and the lowering of the union jack.

Location
TBS was constructed in 1972 over the site of a defunct rack for horse racing. It is bounded by Awolowo road, Cable Street, Force road, Catholic Mission street and the 26-storey independence building.

Monuments
The entrance to the square has gigantic sculptures of four white horses hovering above the gate and seven red eagles, which are symbols from the national emblem signifying Strength and Dignity respectively. Other monuments in the square include the Remembrance Arcade (with memorials to World War I, World War II and Nigerian civil war victims) and the 26-storey Independence House, built in 1963 which was for a long time, the tallest building in Nigeria.

Facilities

The square has a capacity for 50,000 people. Facilities at the square include a shopping center, Airline's Travel Agencies, restaurants and car parking and a bus terminal. 

The cricket ground, the Tafawa Balewa Square Cricket Oval, is widely considered as the 'traditional home of cricket' in Nigeria. It hosted matches in the North-Western sub region of the 2018–19 ICC T20 World Cup Africa Qualifier tournament. The ground has been closed for 18 months to complete a renovation from a concrete surface to 10-strip turf to meet the ICC standards. The renovation was completed in January 2022, following which Nigeria hosted their first Women's Twenty20 International matches in the 2022 Nigeria Invitational Women's T20I Tournament.

Historical Events
Major national events at TBS  includes Nigeria’s independence celebration which took place on  1 October 1960 with the Prime Minister, Tafawa Balewa, delivering his speech. Democracy Day, as well as other multifarious events such as musical jamborees and religious gatherings.

References

Monuments and memorials in Lagos
Landmarks in Lagos
1972 establishments in Nigeria
Squares in Lagos
Lagos Island
Outdoor sculptures in Lagos